Anshumaan Pushkar is an Indian actor. He is best known for playing the role of Rishi Ranjan in the Hotstar original series Grahan (2021) and Jamtara as Rocky on Netflix.

Early life and education
Pushkar was born on 17 August 1993 in Mokama, a small town in the Patna district of Bihar. He is the son of Late Virendra Prasad Singh. His sister is Jhanvi Rajan. He completed his matriculation at S. B. H. School, Mokama and graduated from Vanijya Mahavidyalaya, Patna. After his graduation, he obtained an MBA degree from 
Rajiv Gandhi Institute of Technology, Mumbai.

Career

Filmography

Films

Television

Nominations

References

External links
 

Living people
Indian male television actors
Indian male stage actors
1993 births